A plastic crystal is a crystal composed of weakly interacting molecules that possess some orientational or conformational degree of freedom. The name plastic crystal refers to the mechanical softness of such phases: they resemble waxes and are easily deformed. If the internal degree of freedom is molecular rotation, the name rotor phase or rotatory phase is also used. Typical examples are the modifications Methane I and Ethane I. 
In addition to the conventional molecular plastic crystals, there are also emerging ionic plastic crystals, particularly organic ionic plastic crystals (OIPCs) and protic organic ionic plastic crystals (POIPCs). POIPCs are solid protic organic salts formed by proton transfer from a Brønsted acid to a Brønsted base and in essence are protic ionic liquids in the molten state, have found to be promising solid-state proton conductors for high temperature proton-exchange membrane fuel cells. Examples include 1,2,4-triazolium perfluorobutanesulfonate and imidazolium methanesulfonate.

If the internal degree of freedom freezes in a disordered way, an orientational glass is obtained.

The orientational degree of freedom may be an almost free rotation, or it may be a jump diffusion between a restricted number of possible orientations, as was shown for carbon tetrabromide.

X- ray diffraction patterns of plastic crystals are characterized by strong diffuse intensity in addition to the sharp Bragg peaks. In a powder pattern this intensity appears to resemble an amorphous background as one would expect for a liquid, but for a single crystal the diffuse contribution reveals itself to be highly structured. The Bragg peaks can be used to determine an average structure but due to the large amount of disorder this is not very insightful. It is the structure of the diffuse scattering that reflects the details of the constrained disorder in the system. Recent advances in two-dimensional detection at synchrotron beam lines facilitate the study of such patterns.

Mechanical properties 

Plastic crystals behave like true plastic metals under mechanical stress.
 
For example, closer to melting, plastic crystals show high ductility and/or malleability. Plastic crystals can flow through a hole under pressure. For example, aminoborane plastic crystals bend, twist and stretch with characteristic necking, under appropriate stress. These crystals can be literally shaped into any possible way, like copper or silver metals.

This way, they are very unique compared to other molecular crystals, which are generally brittle and fragile.

Plastic crystals versus liquid crystals 

Like liquid crystals, plastic crystals can be considered a transitional stage between real solids and real liquids and can be considered soft matter. Another common denominator is the simultaneous presence of order and disorder. Both types of phases are usually observed between the true solid and liquid phases on the temperature scale:

 
 

The difference between liquid and plastic crystals is easily observed in X-ray diffraction. Plastic crystals possess strong long range order and therefore show sharp Bragg reflections. Liquid crystals show none or very broad Bragg peaks because the order is not long range. The molecules that give rise to liquid crystalline behavior often have a strongly elongated or disc like shape. Plastic crystals consist usually of almost spherical objects. In this respect one could see them as opposites.

Certain liquid crystals go through plastic crystal phase before melting. In general, liquid crystals are closer to liquids while plastic crystals are closer to true crystals.

History 

Plastic crystals were discovered in 1938 by J. Timmermans by their anomalously low melting entropy. He found that organic substances having a melting entropy lower than approximately 17 J·K−1·mol−1 (~2Rg) are having peculiar properties. Timmermans named them .

Michils showed in 1948 that these organic compounds are easily deformed and accordingly named them, plastic crystals. Perfluorocyclohexane for example is plastic to such a degree that it will start to flow under its own weight.

References

Crystallinity, plastic
Physical quantities
Soft matter
Phases of matter